David Bumpstead (6 November 1935 – 26 August 2017) was an English footballer who played as a defender in the Football League, notably for Bristol Rovers.

Managerial career
Following his retirement, Bumpstead was appointed manager of Athenian League club Wingate. Bumpstead later joined Brentwood Town, managing the club to promotion to the Southern League Premier Division. In 1970, following Brentwood's merger with Chelmsford City, Bumpstead was named manager of Chelmsford. Bumpstead lasted in the role for four years, before ending his association with the club after two months in a general manager role, following the appointment of Syd Prosser as manager.

References

1935 births
2017 deaths
English footballers
Footballers from Rainham, London
Association football defenders
Tooting & Mitcham United F.C. players
Bristol Rovers F.C. players
Millwall F.C. players
English Football League players
Chelmsford City F.C. managers
English football managers